Zygaena is a genus of moths in the family Zygaenidae.

Zygaena may also refer to:

 Sphyrna zygaena, the smooth hammerhead shark
 Zygaena dissimilis and Zygaena mokarran, synonyms of the great hammerhead shark, Sphyrna mokarran
 Zygaena blochii, Zygaena laticeps, Zygaena latycephala, synonyms of the winghead shark, Eusphyra blochii
 Zygaena lewini, Zygaena erythraea, obsolete names for the scalloped hammerhead shark, Sphyrna lewini
 Zygocranchia zygaena, a synonym for Galiteuthis armata, the armed cranch squid